An arrow lock is a lock with standard dimensions used by the United States Postal Service for mail carriers to access collection boxes, outdoor parcel lockers, cluster box units, and apartment mailbox panels. Arrow locks are unlocked through the use of a corresponding arrow key.  Arrow locks are also referred to as "Master Access Locks"

Dimensions and mounting 
An arrow lock is metal and rectangular, measuring 2.005” x 3.566” x .620”,  with a keyhole in the center.  When the user turns the key, a metal bar that normally protrudes from one side is moved through the lock to the other side.  This action may be used to release a door (as in the case of a collection or parcel box) or to press/release a switch (as in the case of an electronic door release).

Arrow locks have four mounting holes, which are evenly spaced at the corners, providing for secure attachment to four 10-32 threaded studs with metal nuts.  A ⅞” hole in the mounting surface is necessary to accommodate the keyhole, which protrudes above the surface of the lock.  USPS approved parcel lockers, cluster box units, and apartment mailbox panels will be manufactured with the hole and studs to accommodate an arrow lock.

Use in key keepers 

In addition to actual mail delivery receptacles, arrow locks can also be found in key keepers, which are small lock boxes containing another key to a secured area where the mail receptacles are located. Similar to knox boxes, key keepers secured with an arrow lock allow postal carriers to access the lobby of unstaffed multifamily buildings to deliver mail.

Private use lock conversion 
Conversion locks are available that match the mechanism and dimensions of USPS arrow locks, but are keyed for private use.

Process for obtaining arrow lock 
To obtain a new or replacement arrow lock, a property owner or manager must contact their local post office branch. The arrow lock will be installed by USPS personnel.

Arrow key accountability 
Arrow keys are meticulously accounted for, and postal workers must check them out and return them daily. When checked out, the arrow key is connected to the postal worker's uniform with a chain to make it harder to misplace.

A United States Postal Service Office of Inspector General audit in 2020 found the controls to be ineffective. It stated that the number of arrow keys in circulation is unknown and keys are not adequately reported lost or stolen.

Illegal use of arrow keys 
Lost or stolen arrow keys have been used by criminals to gain entry to apartment buildings and steal mail, often to commit identity theft. Some criminals also would recreate the arrow keys to gain access.

References 

Postal infrastructure
United States Postal Service